The Chapare River is a river in Bolivia, which is a tributary of the Mamoré River in the Amazon Basin. The river has its source at the confluence of Espíritu Santo River and San Mateo River in the Cochabamba Department at Villa Tunari. It is the main waterway of Chapare Province.

See also 
 Tunari National Park

External links 

 Chapare River Floods

Rivers of Cochabamba Department